The Han-Hsien International Hotel, also known as Linden Hotel, is a  tall skyscraper located in Lingya District of Kaohsiung, Taiwan. It was completed in 1994 and was designed by Kris Yao. The building is 42-stories tall and has a total floor space of 69,815 m2. When it was completed in 1994, it was the third tallest buildings in Kaohsiung at the time after Chang-Gu World Trade Center and Asia-Pacific Financial Plaza.

See also
 List of tallest buildings in Asia
 List of tallest buildings in Taiwan
 List of tallest buildings in Kaohsiung

References

1994 establishments in Taiwan
Hotel buildings completed in 1994
Skyscraper hotels in Kaohsiung